The Chair of Natural Philosophy is a professorship at the University of Glasgow, in Scotland, which was established in 1727

The Nova Erectio of King James VI of Scotland shared the teaching of moral philosophy, logic and natural philosophy among the regents.

In 1727 separate chairs were instituted.

Professors of natural philosophy
 Robert Dick Snr MA MD (1727)
 Robert Dick Jnr MA MD (1751)
 John Anderson MA (1757)
 James Brown MA MD (1796)
 William Meikleham MA LLD (1803)
 William Thomson, 1st Baron Kelvin of Largs GCVO MA DCL LLD FRS (1846)
 Andrew Gray MA LLD FRS (1899)
 Harold Albert Wilson MA DSc FRS (1924)
 Edward Taylor Jones DSc LLD (1926)
 Philip Ivor Dee CBE MA FRS
 Robert Patton Ferrier BSc MA PhD FRSE (1973)

See also
List of Professorships at the University of Glasgow

References

Physics education in the United Kingdom
Natural Philosophy
Natural Philosophy, Glasgow
1727 establishments in Scotland
Natural philosophy
1727 in science